Finshneachta Ua Cuill, Irish poet, died 958.

Finshneachta was an obscure Irish poet who was regarded as the leading poet of the kingdom of Munster in Ireland, upon his death in 958. He died on the same year that Faifne an Filí, chief poet of Leinster, died.

Annalistic references
 958. Finshneachta Ua Cuill, poet of Munster, died.

See also

Other tenth-century Irish poets included:
 Cináed ua hArtacáin
 Eochaid ua Flannacáin
 Torpaid mac Taicthech

External links
 http://www.ucc.ie/celt/published/T100005B/index.html

Medieval Irish poets
10th-century Irish writers
10th-century Irish poets
Irish male poets